Bettye Fahrenkamp (September 6, 1923 – August 12, 1991) was an American educator and politician.

Born in Wilder, Fentress County, Tennessee, Fahrenkamp served in the Women's Army Corps during World War II. She  received her bachelor's degree in education from the University of Tennessee. In 1956, Fahrenkamp moved to Fairbanks, Alaska Territory with her husband, "Gib" Fahrenkamp, a contractor (and later fellow politician), where she taught music in the Fairbanks school district. Fahrenkamp retired from teaching in 1974. She was involved with the Democratic Party and served on the staff of United States Senator Mike Gravel of Alaska. Fahrenkamp served in the Alaska Senate from 1979 until her death in 1991. Fahrenkamp died from bone cancer at her home in Fairbanks, Alaska.

The Alaska Legislature passed a bill in 1992 to name room 203 in the Alaska State Capitol as the "Fahrenkamp Room" in her honor.

References

1923 births
1991 deaths
People from Fentress County, Tennessee
Politicians from Fairbanks, Alaska
Military personnel from Tennessee
Women in the United States Army
University of Tennessee alumni
Educators from Tennessee
American women educators
Women state legislators in Alaska
Democratic Party Alaska state senators
Deaths from cancer in Alaska
Deaths from bone cancer
20th-century American politicians
20th-century American women politicians